Patrick Rowe may refer to:

Patrick Rowe (American football), American football player
Patrick Rowe (cricketer), Australian cricketer
Patrick Rowe (Royal Navy officer)
Pat Rowe, Australian basketball player